Annika Sofia Wiel Hvannberg (earlier Wiel Fredén) (born 21 August 1978) is a Swedish handball player.

She began her career in BK Heid and played for them until she was 25 years. She then changed to IK Sävehof, where she played for three years before she moved to Denmark and became a professional. As a professional, she played for the Danish club Horsens HK and for the Swedish national team. She competed at the 2008 Summer Olympics in China, where the Swedish team placed eighth and at the 2012 Summer Olympics where the Swedish team was 11th. When she returned to Sweden, she again played for her motherclub BK Heid, and also played on 9M and not only right wing as earlier. She stopped her career after season 2014/15.

She played 119 matches for the Swedish national team. In 2006 she was handballer of the year. The greatest achievement in her career was EM-silver 2010. She debut in the national team in 2005, and her last match was 2012. In 2008 she seriously injured her knee. Annika Wiel Hvannberg took part in Handball-EM 2006, OS in Peking 2008, Handball-EM 2010, handball VM 2011 and OS 2012 in London.

References

External links

1978 births
Living people
Swedish female handball players
Handball players at the 2008 Summer Olympics
Handball players at the 2012 Summer Olympics
Olympic handball players of Sweden